Admiral Sir John Louis, 2nd Baronet (1785 – 31 March 1863) was an officer in the Royal Navy.

Naval career
John Louis, son of Rear-Admiral Sir Thomas Louis, 1st Baronet, entered the Navy in 1795, was promoted to lieutenant in 1801, to commander in 1805 and to captain in 1806. He served during 1810 off the coast of Ireland and off Cadiz, was in the Mediterranean in 1811 and then went out to the West Indies. After several years on half-pay, he served again in the West Indies, 1826 to 1830. In 1837 he was appointed Captain Superintendent of Woolwich Dockyard and also to the command of the William and Mary yacht. Promoted to rear admiral in 1838, he was Admiral Superintendent of Malta Dockyard, 1838 to 1843, and Admiral Superintendent of Devonport, 1846 to 1850. Louis was promoted to vice-admiral in 1849 and to admiral in 1851.

He succeeded his father as 2nd Baronet on 17 May 1807.

He is buried with his wife, Maria Clementina Louis, and son, Thomas Louis, in Kensal Green Cemetery in London.

References
 Sir John Louis, 2nd Baronet

External links
 

1785 births
1863 deaths
Burials at Kensal Green Cemetery
Baronets in the Baronetage of the United Kingdom
Royal Navy admirals